The International Journal of Computational Geometry and Applications (IJCGA) is a bimonthly journal published since 1991, by World Scientific. It covers the application of computational geometry in design and analysis of algorithms, focusing on problems arising in various fields of science and engineering such as computer-aided geometry design (CAGD), operations research, and others.

The current editors-in-chief are D.-T. Lee of the Institute of Information Science in Taiwan, and Joseph S. B. Mitchell from the Department of Applied Mathematics and Statistics
in the State University of New York at Stony Brook.

Abstracting and indexing 
 Current Contents/Engineering, Computing & Technology
 ISI Alerting Services
 Science Citation Index Expanded (also known as SciSearch)
 CompuMath Citation Index
 Mathematical Reviews
 INSPEC
 DBLP Bibliography Server
 Zentralblatt MATH
 Computer Abstracts

References

External links 
 IJCGA Journal Website

Computer science journals
World Scientific academic journals
Bimonthly journals
Mathematics journals
English-language journals
Computational geometry